Sigrid Catherine Nielsen (b. March 1948) is best known as the co-founder and co-owner of Scotland's first LGBT bookshop Lavender Menace Bookshop.

Life and career 
Sigrid grew up in America, before settling in Scotland. Once in Scotland, she assisted Sylvia Neri in managing a Scottish Minorities Group (SMG) (now Outright Scotland) Women's Group, in 1975–1976. However, Neri noted that Sigrid could only do it for a short time, as she had so many commitments.

Sigrid teamed up with business partner Bob Orr to run a bookstall at the Scottish Homosexual Rights Group (SHRG) on Broughton Street in 1976, Edinburgh. Trading initially under the name Lavender Books, they named the bookstall Open Gaze. 

This eventually became what is now known as the Lavender Menace Bookshop.

Writing 
Sigrid went on to co-edit a book with Gail Chester, In Other Words Writing as a Feminist, in 1987. This radical feminist perspective of women’s publishing brings attention to the significance of writing for women's liberation. 

At this time Sigrid contributed to LGBTQ+ newspaper, The Pink Paper, including a column entitled: Fortune, fame and the feminist (1988).

See also 
List of LGBT bookstores
LGBT culture
List of feminists

References 

Living people
1948 births
American feminists
American writers
American women writers